Mark Hannebery (born 8 October 1957) is a former Australian rules footballer who played with Collingwood and Essendon in the Victorian Football League (VFL).

Career
Hannebery, a left footed half-back flanker and wingman, was recruited from North Melbourne CBC Old Boys. He was part of a strong Collingwood team in his early years, with the club making the grand final in each of his first three seasons. Despite playing 36 games in that period, he never played in a final.

He made a single appearance for Essendon in 1984, which was against his former club.

After his VFL career ended, Hannebery returned to North Melbourne CBC, as captain-coach.

Personal life
Hannebery's brother Matt played for Footscray and his nephew Dan is a Sydney premiership player.

References

1957 births
Australian rules footballers from Victoria (Australia)
Collingwood Football Club players
Essendon Football Club players
Living people